The Best Western Plus Casino Royale (formerly known as the Nob Hill Casino and Casino Royale) is a casino and hotel on the Las Vegas Strip in Paradise, Nevada. The casino caters to low rollers.

History

Nob Hill (1978-1992)
Before 1992, this property neighbored the Sands Hotel Casino and contained several motels, restaurants and casinos: Bill's Place, Bon Aire Motel, Motor Inn Motel, Louigi's Charcoal Broiler, and Frank Musso's Restaurant. In the 1960s, a Denny's restaurant was built here.

What is now Casino Royale's hotel opened in the spring of 1964 as the Caravan Motor Hotel. The 164-room establishment was developed by local construction firm Heers Bros, Inc. By 1968, the hotel was affiliated with the Travelodge chain and was known as the Caravan Travelodge.

In July 1978, the Nob Hill Casino opened between the Denny's and Travelodge. It was operated by a group of four partners who also owned the nearby Holiday Casino (now Harrah's), led by Claudine Williams. The Nob Hill became famous as a new smaller Strip casino with the lowest Strip  limits at table games, including .25 craps,.10 roulette, and 1.00 blackjack.  In 1983, Holiday Inns purchased the operating business of the Nob Hill, as part of a package deal in which it also acquired full ownership of the Holiday Casino. The Nob Hill closed on November 26, 1990, because the lease on the property expired.

Casino Royale (1992-present)
Elardi was the general manager and co-owner of the Frontier casino hotel. Elardi purchased the casino and the hotel for $17 million.

From its opening, the Casino Royale was subjected to picketing by members of the Culinary Workers Union because of its shared ownership with the Frontier hotel, where workers had been on strike since September 1991. Picketing continued until 1998, when the strike was resolved by the Elardi family's sale of the Frontier.

In January 2013, the property was rebranded as part of the Best Western hotel chain.

In 2014, the Denny's at the north side of the building, which had been the restaurant chain's highest-volume location, was demolished and replaced with a two-story, $9-million addition, with a Walgreens drug store on the ground floor, and a new Denny's on the second floor. The project also added a White Castle burger restaurant, which opened with great fanfare as the chain's first location in the Western United States.

Gaming
Casino Royale is known for its promotional slot play. Timeshare promotions in Las Vegas often give out Casino Royale slot play, to be used at specific machines.

In the late 1990s, Casino Royale had the highest odds in Nevada at craps. The game was a 50 cent minimum bet game, which allowed a player to place 100 times more in the odd bet. It was not uncommon to see 50 cent bets with $25 to $50 odds bets. This was when the rest of the Strip was allowed double to 10 times odds. The Casino Royale was the first casino property on the Strip to install Geoff Hall's blackjack variant, Blackjack Switch. The success of Blackjack Switch at the casino led to the game spreading to many other casinos.

Popular culture
The Casino Royale was represented in the 2004 video game Grand Theft Auto: San Andreas as the Royal Casino.
There is a hidden achievement in Project Gotham Racing 4 in which the player must take a picture in front of the Casino Royale while in an Aston Martin DBS.

Gallery

References
Footnotes

Citations

External links

Casinos in the Las Vegas Valley
Hotels established in 1992
Las Vegas Strip
Hotels in Paradise, Nevada
Best Western Hotels
Casino hotels
1992 establishments in Nevada